Sebastian Kraupp (born 20 May 1985) is a Swedish curler from Karlstad, Sweden. He currently coaches the Swedish men's junior team.

From 2005 to 2008 Sebastian Kraupp skipped his own team. Starting with the 2008–2009 season he joined Niklas Edin's team throwing Third stones.

Team Edin first achieved widespread attention at the 2009 Aberdeen European Championships where they stunned the curling competition by finishing second after the round robin tournament with a 7 – 2 record. Their only loses were to Team Murdoch of Scotland and Team Ulsrud of Norway who had won the Gold and Bronze medals respectively at the 2009 Moncton World Championships. In the 1 vs. 2 Playoff Game Kraupp's team took on Team Ulsrud of Norway who they upset 7 to 3 advancing directly to the Gold Medal match. In the final they faced Ralph Stöckli's team from Switzerland. They pulled off another upset and won their first European title.

Sebastian Kraupp and his team represented Sweden at the 2010 Winter Olympics. Team Sweden finished the Round Robin portion in a tie for the Playoffs with Team Great Britain, which they won. In the semifinal match they lost to Team Canada skipped by Kevin Martin. They lost to Team Switzerland in the Bronze medal match and finished fourth overall matching the achievement of Team Sweden at the 2002 Salt Lake City Olympics.

In 2011 he was inducted into the Swedish Curling Hall of Fame.

Teammates
2009 Aberdeen European Championships

2010 Vancouver Olympic Games

Niklas Edin, Skip

Fredrik Lindberg, Second

Viktor Kjäll, Lead

Oskar Eriksson, Alternate

References

External links
 

Living people
1985 births
Sportspeople from Stockholm
Sportspeople from Karlstad
Swedish male curlers
Olympic curlers of Sweden
Curlers at the 2010 Winter Olympics
Curlers at the 2014 Winter Olympics
Olympic medalists in curling
Olympic bronze medalists for Sweden
Medalists at the 2014 Winter Olympics
World curling champions
European curling champions
Swedish curling champions
Universiade medalists in curling
Universiade gold medalists for Sweden
Universiade bronze medalists for Sweden
Medalists at the 2007 Winter Universiade
Competitors at the 2007 Winter Universiade
Competitors at the 2009 Winter Universiade
Swedish curling coaches